The Lewis-Williams House is a historic house located in Hudson, Wisconsin. It was added to the National Register of Historic Places in 1985.

It is a one-and-a-half-story "romantic" Gothic Revival cottage overlooking the St. Croix River.  It has multiple steep gables "ornamented with finials and heavy elaborate wooden bargeboard with pendants."

It was bought by Dr. Boyd T. Williams in 1930 and used as a cancer treatment facility.  Williams died in 1948;  the house remains as a "historic representative of the locality's development of health services and the last surviving symbol of Dr. Boyd T. Williams' medical contributions."

References

Houses in St. Croix County, Wisconsin
Houses on the National Register of Historic Places in Wisconsin
Gothic Revival architecture in Wisconsin
Houses completed in 1860
National Register of Historic Places in St. Croix County, Wisconsin